The Man Who Played God may refer to:
The Man Who Played God (1922 film)
The Man Who Played God (1932 film)
The Man Who Played God (novel)  by Robert St. John